The Brandeis University President's House, also known as the Leland Powers House, is an historic house on 66 Beaumont Avenue in Newton, Massachusetts.  Built in 1913–14 for Leland Powers, it is a prominent large-scale example of Craftsman architecture. It has also served as the official residence of two presidents of Brandeis University and Roger Berkowitz, the CEO of Legal Sea Foods. The house was listed on the National Register of Historic Places in 1998.

Description and history
The Brandeis University President's House stands in a subdivision known as Grove Hill Park, on the south side of the village of Newtonville. It is set at the northeast corner of Beaumont and Prospect Streets, amid other houses of similar scale. It is a two-story L-shaped structure, oriented with its main facade to the north, presenting a side to Beaumont Street and the house rear to Prospect. It is covered by a hip roof with broad raking eaves, under which rafters are exposed. The main facade has bands of windows on either side of the center entrance, which has sidelight windows articulated by brackets supporting a projecting cornice, which transitions to a half-round shape that houses a transom window. The exterior is finished in stucco applied over rubblestone walls The interior is richly decorated with Arts and Crafts features.

The house was built in 1913–14 as the residence of  [Leland Powers], and was severely damaged by an anarchist bomb attack in 1919. Powers, at the time a state legislator, was active in legislating against the rise of anarchist activity; his family moved out of the house in 1921. It was acquired in 1948 by the recently founded Brandeis University as the home of its first president, Abram L. Sachar.  During Sachar's residence, the house was a center of entertainment related to the university, playing host to high-profile guests from politics and academia. The university sold the house in 1992 to Roger Berkowitz, the chief executive of Legal Sea Foods, but repurchased it in 1994 as the official residence of Jehuda Reinharz, its seventh president. The university sold it again in 2012.

See also
 National Register of Historic Places listings in Newton, Massachusetts

References

Houses on the National Register of Historic Places in Newton, Massachusetts
President's House
Houses completed in 1919